Scoles Manor, also known as Scoles Farm House, is former farmhouse and a Grade II* listed building, two miles from Corfe Castle in Dorset, England. It is believed to be the oldest continuously occupied building in Corfe Castle parish. The main part of the house was built in 1635 and there is a medieval structure attached which has been dated to 1280 and which was either a chapel or a small hall house.

The name Scoles is derived from the family called Scoville or Scovil who originally came from the village of Escoville in Normandy. There are records of Scovilles living here in the 13th and 14th centuries but the property was then passed to their female descendants (including Dacombes and Colsons) before being bought in c. 1810 by John Scott, 1st Earl of Eldon.

References 

Grade II* listed buildings in Dorset
Grade II* listed houses
Houses in Dorset
Corfe Castle